Sike may refer to:
 Gill (ravine), also called sike or syke

People
 András Sike (born 1965), Hungarian bantamweight Greco-Roman wrestler
 Jozsef Sike (born 1968), Hungarian sport shooter
 Wu Sike (born 1946), senior diplomat of the People's Republic of China

Other uses
 Sike Station
 Sike Williams
 Supersingular isogeny key exchange

See also
 Sikes (disambiguation)
 Syke (disambiguation)